Lady Yehe-Nara (侧福晋叶赫那拉氏）was a consort of Hong Taiji. Her personal name was Wuyunzhu (乌云珠)

Family background 
Wuyunzhu's father, Anabu (阿纳布) was reputed to be a relative of Gintaisi, a leader of Yehe confederation. 

Lady Yehe Nara's grandfather Yalinbu (雅林布) used to be a cousin of Yangginu, the father of Empress Xiaocigao, Monggo Jerjer.  According to Qing dynasty archival documents, Yalinbu's and Yangginu's grandfather was Chukungge (褚孔革).

 Father: Anabu (阿纳布), chieftain (beile) of Yehe (贝勒)
 Paternal grandfather: Yalinbu (雅林布)
 Great great grandafather: Chukungge (褚孔革）
 First paternal uncle: Narimbulu
 Second paternal uncle: Gintaisi

Live

Before entry to the imperial court 
Neither date of birth nor date of Wuyunzhu's death are known. Before entry to the imperial household, lady Yehe Nara had been married to Karkama, a leader of Ula valley.

Live at the imperial court 
Lady Yehe Nara was taken by Hong Taiji in 1619 shortly after execution of her first husband as a result of annexation of Yehe, the common practice of Manchus.  In 1620, Nurhaci's councubine Dayinzha discovered Lady Abahai having stolen gold and silver items. At the time palace gates were closed, Dayinzha realized she could not embrace so many items. Stolen objects were given to Nurhaci's consort Nanakun and Uyunzhu, who received 1 set of mang pattern blankets and cushions. On 17 January 1628, Lady Yehe Nara gave birth to fifth imperial son, Šose. Shuose was raised in the Qingning palace together with Bomubogor and Fulin, the future Shunzhi Emperor.

Live after leaving imperial court 
After giving birth to Shuose, lady Wuyunzhu left the court and married minister Zhan Tuxietu. Lady Yehe Nara became a victim of domestic violence shortly after the marriage. The fairly abusive behavior of Zhan Tuxietu led her to the fourth marriage with Darhu (达尔琥), a member of the Hada Nara clan of the Bordered Yellow Banner.

References 

Manchu people
17th-century people
Consorts of Hong Taiji